Moselle Romance is an extinct Gallo-Romance (most probably Langue d'oïl) dialect that developed after the fall of the Roman Empire along the Moselle river in modern-day Germany, near the border with France. It was part of a wider group of Romance relic areas within the German-speaking territory. Despite heavy Germanic influence, it persisted in isolated pockets until the 11th century.

Historical background 

After Julius Caesar conquered Gaul in 50 BC, a Gallo-Roman culture gradually developed in what is today France, southern Belgium, Luxembourg, and the region between Trier and Koblenz. By contrast, the adjacent province of Germania Inferior and part of Germania Superior retained a Germanic character throughout the Imperial period.

Emergence 

The Angles and Saxons, en route to England from their ancestral lands in the western Netherlands and Germany, carved a path through Holland, Flanders, and Brabant and sent the local Franks fleeing southeast along the Ourthe and Sauer rivers to the region around Metz and the Upper Moselle. This drove a sixty-kilometer wedge between the Gallo-Romans in the Trier-Koblenz area and their linguistic brethren in the rest of Gaul.

Judging by the archeological evidence, these newly arrived Franks practiced farming and animal husbandry about Bitburg, Gutland, the Middle and Upper Saar, and the Moselle Valley – strongly preferring these last two over the others.

According to linguist Alberto Varvaro the linguistic frontier between German and Latin populations around the 13th century was similar to the present language frontier, but only a few years before there still was a "remaining area of neolatin speakers" in the valleys of the Mosella river (near old Roman Treviri).

Decline 

The local Gallo-Roman placenames suggest that the left bank of the Moselle was Germanized following the 8th century, but the right bank remained Romance-speaking into at least the 10th century. Said names include Maring-Noviand, Osann-Monzel, Longuich, Riol, Hatzenport, Longkamp, Karden, and Kröv or Alf. This being a wine-growing region, a number of viticultural terms from Moselle Romance have survived in the local German dialect.

Features 
The following Late Latin inscription from the sixth century is assumed to show influence from early Moselle Romance:
"For Mauricius his wife Montana who lived with him for twelve years made this gravestone; he was forty years old and died on the 25th of May."

A Latin text from the 9th century written in the monastery of Prüm by local monks contains several Vulgar Latin terms which are attested only in modern Gallo-Romance languages, especially northeastern French and Franco-Provençal, such  'timber' or  'chives'. Based on evidence from toponyms and loanwords into Moselle Franconian dialects, the latest detectable form of Moselle Romance can be classified as a Langue d'oïl dialect. This can seen e.g. in the placenames Kasnode <  and Roveroth < , which display a characteristic change of Vulgar Latin stressed /e/ in open syllables.

See also
 African Romance
 British Latin
 Pannonian Romance

References

 Wolfgang Jungandreas: Zur Geschichte des Moselromanischen. Studien zur Lautchronologie und zur Winzerlexik (Mainzer Studien zur Sprach- und Volksforschung; 3). Steiner Verlag, Wiesbaden 1979, .

Romance languages
Extinct Romance languages
Eifel in the Middle Ages
Eifel in the Roman era